Bruno Massot (born 28 January 1989) is a French-German pair skating coach and former competitor. Competing with Aljona Savchenko for Germany, he is the 2018 Olympic Champion, the 2018 World Champion, a two-time European silver medalist, and two-time German national champion (2016, 2018).

Competing with Daria Popova for France, he became the 2014 Challenge Cup champion and 2012 French national champion.

Personal life
Bruno Massot was born on 28 January 1989 in Caen, France. On 15 April 2015, he announced his engagement to his longtime girlfriend, Sophie Levaufre. Their son, Louka, was born on 1 October 2018 in La Chaux-de-Fonds, Switzerland.

On 23 November 2017, the Deutsche Eislauf-Union announced that Massot would be sworn in as a German citizen in a week.

Career

Early career 
Massot began learning to skate in 1996. From the age of seven, he was coached by Jean-François Ballester. He competed in single skating through the 2006–07 season.

When he was 17 years old, Ballester convinced him to try pair skating. Massot teamed up with Camille Foucher, with whom he won a pair of senior bronze medals at the French Championships and competed at two World Junior Championships. After their partnership ended, he skated with Anne-Laure Letscher until February 2011.

Massot and Daria Popova decided to team up in March 2011 and began serious training in June.

2011–2012 season 
Popova/Massot trained mainly in Caen, France, with Jean-Francois Ballester. In their first season together, they also trained about three weeks every three months with Ingo Steuer in Chemnitz, Germany. Popova/Massot's first competition together was the 2011 Master's de Patinage, where they won the silver medal. They were tenth in their international debut at the 2011 Coupe de Nice and placed fourth at the 2011 NRW Trophy. In December 2011, they won the 2012 French national title ahead of Vanessa James / Morgan Cipres.

Visa and administrative delays led to uncertainty about their participation at the 2012 European Championships but the situation was resolved just before the event. Popova/Massot placed sixth in the short program and eighth overall. They were not assigned to the 2012 World Championships, but were part of the French team for the World Team Trophy.

2012–2013 season 
Popova/Massot received two Grand Prix assignments — they placed fifth at the 2012 Skate Canada International and seventh at the 2012 Trophée Eric Bompard. They were second to James/Cipres at the French Championships and then placed seventh at the 2013 European Championships. At the 2013 World Championships, James/Cipres earned two spots for France in the pairs' event at the 2014 Winter Olympics in Sochi. As France's second-ranked pair, Popova/Massot were in line to receive the second Olympic spot if she received French citizenship in time.

2013–2014 season 
Popova had a problem with the sole of one of her boots at the start of the season. She and Massot placed eighth at their first Grand Prix assignment, the 2013 Cup of China. Popova then ceased training for six weeks due to a stress fracture in the third metatarsal bone of her left foot, causing the pair to withdraw from the 2013 Trophée Eric Bompard and French Championships.

Having resumed training in mid-December 2013, the pair elected to reduce the difficulty of some elements for the 2014 European Championships in January. They finished eleventh at Europeans in Budapest. On 21 January 2014, it was reported that Popova had not received French citizenship in time and France's second spot would be transferred to Austria. Popova and Massot then went on to place fifteenth at the 2014 World Figure Skating Championships after placing fifteenth in both segments of the competition. It was their last competition together.

Teaming up with Savchenko and obtaining his release

On 19 March 2014, Massot was reported to have teamed up with Aljona Savchenko of Germany. The two began training together in April, working to adjust to each other's different technique. They made their first appearance as a pair at the 2014 All That Skate shows in South Korea. Because Chemnitz melted its ice rink until nearly the end of August, they trained in Coral Springs, Florida for two months beginning in mid-July.

Since the ISU does not allow any pairing to compete under two flags, one partner was obliged to change country and could not compete internationally until the previous country granted a release. In July 2014, Savchenko said that she preferred to continue competing for Germany while Massot preferred France. On 29 September 2014, the Deutsche Eislauf-Union announced that the pair had decided to skate for Germany. In October 2014, Savchenko/Massot started training in Oberstdorf, coached by Alexander König.

On 9 June 2015, Massot's mother announced that the Fédération Française des Sports de Glace (FFSG) had refused to release Massot to skate for Germany. He was not allowed to compete or perform in shows until the FFSG released him. Consequently, he lived on 200 euros a month for one and a half years. He considered living in his car but the Deutsche Eislauf-Union stepped in with financial assistance to cover his rent, food, and training expenses, and to find some furniture. On 31 August 2015, the FFSG reportedly demanded a fee of 70,000 euros to release Massot, but later agreed to 30,000 euros. He was released to skate for Germany on 26 October 2015.

2015–2016 season
Savchenko/Massot made their debut at the 2015 CS Tallinn Trophy, an ISU Challenger Series (CS) event, where they won the gold medal. That was followed by gold at the 2015 CS Warsaw Cup and German Championships. In January, they won silver at the 2016 European Championships in Bratislava, Slovakia. It was Massot's first medal at an ISU Championship.

In April, they won the bronze medal at the 2016 World Championships in Boston, having placed fourth in the short program and third in the free skate.

2016–2017 season
After taking gold at the 2016 CS Nebelhorn Trophy, Savchenko/Massot won both of their Grand Prix events, the 2016 Rostelecom Cup and 2016 Trophée de France. On 12 November, Savchenko tore a ligament in her right ankle on the landing of the throw triple Axel during the free skate in France. She decided to continue skating due to the possibility of a medal and being in a partnership, saying "If you were alone you might just throw in the towel, but there is that other half of the pair, who is also competing." She stated, "Luckily, the ligaments were not completely ruptured, but it takes eight to twelve weeks to heal." As a result, the pair withdrew from their December competitions, the Grand Prix Final and German Championships.

In January 2017, Savchenko/Massot won the silver medal, behind Russia's Evgenia Tarasova / Vladimir Morozov, at the 2017 European Championships in Ostrava, Czech Republic. In April, the pair received the silver medal, behind China's Sui Wenjing / Han Cong, at the 2017 World Championships in Helsinki, Finland.

2017–2018 season
Savchenko/Massot began their season with silver at the 2017 CS Nebelhorn Trophy. Turning to the Grand Prix series, they took silver at the 2017 Skate Canada International after placing first in the short program and second in the free skate. Ranked third in the short and first in the free, the pair won gold at the 2017 Skate America. Their results qualified them to the Grand Prix Final in December, which they won.

In November 2017, Massot received German citizenship, allowing the pair to compete for Germany at the 2018 Winter Olympics.

Savchenko and Massot withdrew from the European Figure Skating Championships on 12 January, in order to focus their preparations for the Olympics.

After competing in the first part of the team event, Savchenko and Massot competed in the individual pairs event. They placed fourth in the short program after Massot doubled a jump. On 15 February 2018, Savchenko and Massot won the gold medal at the 2018 Winter Olympics, with a new world record score of 159.31 in the free skate.

Savchenko and Massot ended the season at the 2018 World Championships in Milan, Italy, where they won their first world title together.  They set new personal bests in both the short and free programs, in the process setting new world records for the free skate and combined score.  Massot commented:  "It was exactly the season that we wanted. We started this season in September and we said, 'we will give our best to win everything.' We didn’t go to Europeans in order to prepare for the Olympics. I think it was a good choice. We realized today that we reached our goal of the season today."

Following their World Championship victory, it was announced that the pair would take an indefinite break from competition.

Coaching career
In the summer of 2018, Massot joined the coaching staff for the Austrian pairs team of Miriam Ziegler and Severin Kiefer.

Programs

With Savchenko

With Popova

With Foucher

Single skating

Competitive highlights
GP: Grand Prix; CS: Challenger Series; JGP: Junior Grand Prix

With Savchenko for Germany

With Popova for France

With Foucher and Letscher for France

Singles career for France

Detailed results
Small medals for short and free programs awarded only at ISU Championships. At team events, medals awarded for team results only.

With Savchenko

References

External links

 
 
 
 
 
 
 

1989 births
Living people
Sportspeople from Caen
German male pair skaters
French male pair skaters
French male single skaters
Figure skaters at the 2018 Winter Olympics
Olympic figure skaters of Germany
French emigrants to Germany
Naturalized citizens of Germany
Olympic gold medalists for Germany
Medalists at the 2018 Winter Olympics
Olympic medalists in figure skating
Season-end world number one figure skaters
Season's world number one figure skaters
European Figure Skating Championships medalists
World Figure Skating Championships medalists
French figure skating coaches